VfL Wolfsburg's Volkswagen-funded attack on the established Bundesliga top teams nearly ended in tears, with the side only staying up due to a draw in a directly decisive fixture at home to Kaiserslautern. Cédric Makiadi and Diego Klimowicz turned a 0-1 deficit around within just minutes during the second half, before an equaliser from Marcel Ziemer five minutes from time made for a nervy conclusion. But with no further goals scored, Wolfsburg just stayed up following a nightmare season.

Players

First-team squad
Squad at end of season

Left club during season

Results

Bundesliga

References

VfL Wolfsburg seasons
Wolfsburg